Divinidylle Tour is the third live album by singer Vanessa Paradis. The album was recorded during her Divinidylle Tour and was also released with a DVD which documented the tour and Paradis' promotion of the album. The DVD won a Victoires de la Musique award for Best DVD Musical of the year.

Track listing
  "Irrésistiblement"  3:21 
  "Divine idylle"  2:44 
  Vanessa Paradis & -M- - "Les piles" 2:50 
  "Be My Baby"  3:39 
  "Dis lui toi que je t'aime"  4:32 
  "Que fait la vie?"  4:25 
  "La mélodie"  5:25 
  "Junior suite"  3:35 
  "Varvara Pavlovna"  2:28 
  "Pourtant"  5:55 
  "La bataille"  3:40 
  "Joe le taxi"  4:04 
  "Emmenez-moi"  3:58 
  "L'incendie"  4:57 
  "Les revenants"  4:15 
  "Chet Baker"  3:01 
  "Dès que j'te vois"  5:55 
  "Saint Germain"  2:21 
  "Jackadi"  3:36 
  "Le tourbillon"  1:34

Personnel
Vanessa Paradis - vocals
François Lasserre, Matthieu Chedid - guitar
Jérôme Goldet - bass
Albin de la Simone - piano
Patrice Renson - drums

Charts

Album

References

http://www.lescharts.com/showitem.asp?key=97783&cat=a

Vanessa Paradis albums
2008 live albums
Barclay (record label) live albums